The 1972 U.S. Clay Court Championships was a combined men's and women's tennis tournament that was part of the 1972 Grand Prix circuit. The event was held in Indianapolis, USA and played on outdoor clay courts. It was the 4th edition of the tournament in the Open Era and was held in from 7 August through 13 August 1972. Bob Hewitt  and Chris Evert won the singles titles.

Finals

Men's singles
 Bob Hewitt defeated  Jimmy Connors 7–6, 6–1, 6–2

Women's singles
 Chris Evert defeated  Evonne Goolagong 7–6, 6–1

Men's doubles
 Bob Hewitt /  Frew McMillan defeated  Jaime Fillol /  Patricio Cornejo 6–2, 6–3

Women's doubles
 Evonne Goolagong /  Lesley Hunt defeated  Margaret Court /  Pam Teeguarden 6–2, 6–1

References

External links 
 ATP Tournament profile
 ITF Tournament details

U.S. Men's Clay Court Championships
U.S. Men's Clay Court Championships
U.S. Clay Court Championships
U.S. Clay Court Championships